Copely is a surname. Notable people with the surname include:

 Dean Copely (born 1989), American ice dancer
 Katherine Copely (born 1988), American ice dancer
 Marc Copely, American guitarist and songwriter

See also
 Copley (disambiguation)